Francisco Nouet (born 25 May 1998) is an Argentine professional footballer who plays as a forward for Villa Dálmine.

Career
Nouet began with Paraná de San Pedro, before joining Villa Dálmine. The 2017–18 campaign in Primera B Nacional saw Nouet make his bow in senior football, making it during a 1–1 draw away to Instituto on 2 February 2018; he had previously been an unused substitute for games with Sarmiento and Estudiantes in 2017. He featured in a total of five fixtures in 2017–18 as they placed eighth; losing in the play-offs to San Martín. In July 2019, Nouet was loaned to Primera B Metropolitana team Flandria; reuniting with his brother. He scored on his second appearance, netting in a 3–1 victory away to Fénix; his sibling also scored.

Personal life
Nouet's brother, Matías, is a fellow professional footballer; both of them began their senior careers with Villa Dálmine.

Career statistics
.

References

External links

1998 births
Living people
Sportspeople from Buenos Aires Province
Argentine footballers
Association football forwards
Primera Nacional players
Primera B Metropolitana players
Villa Dálmine footballers
Flandria footballers